Sheikh Muhammed Osman Sirajeddin Naqshbandi (Arabic: الشيخ مُحَمَدْ عُثمان سراجُ الدّین نَقشبَندی), Seyyid Osman Sirajeddin-i Thani or Baba Shah (1314 AH/1896 AD, Biyara, Kurdistan) – 1418 AH/1997 AD, Istanbul, Turkey) was an Islamic scholar and Naqshbandi mystic.

Biography 
The ancestry of Osman Sirajuddin, the grandson of Sheikh Omar Ziyaeddin and son of Sheikh Muhammed Alaeddin, is connected to Prophet Muhammad through Huseyin bin Ali. Since he was named Osman in honor of his great-grandfather, Uthman Sirajuddin at-Tavili, he was given the nickname "Thani"/"Sani", which means the second in Arabic. Osman Sirajeddin was of Kurdistan or Iraqi Kurdish origin and born in 1896 in the Iraqi village of Biyara. After studying religious sciences under the supervision and training of his father at a young age, he completed his education in Arabic and Persian at the Duru and Biyara madrasas. Following the death of his father, he settled in the Biyara Sufi Lodge (Tekke). He continued his spreading knowledge and guidance activities without interruption until 1958. He immigrated to Iran in 1959 due to the unsuitable political environment at the time in Kurdistan.

Time in Iran/Kurdistan 
Osman Sirajeddin was appreciated and respected by the people of knowledge and madrasah in [Kurdistan[Iran]] and brought back to life the Duru Tekke founded by his father. As a result of his travels to different parts of Iran, he established a strong bond between the members of the Khalidi Naqshbandis in the Sunni regions in the northwest and in the Talish Kurdistan region of Iran. He had a school built for 450 students providing education in the field of Islamic sciences. At the same time, more than 100 schools were built in the region under his leadership. There was an increase in the number and activities of Naqshbandi members during the twenty-year period he was in Iran.

After the 1979 Iranian revolution, he left Iran and returned to Biyara, but he soon moved to Baghdad due to the Iran-Iraq War at the time. He then continued his activities in France and later in Turkey.

Time in Turkey 
Osman Sirajeddin settled in Turkey in 1990 and had religious conversations with his domestic and foreign visitors in his guesthouse in Hadımköy, Istanbul. He sought remedies for the material and spiritual ailments of the people who came to him. The sweet smile on his face was never lost. It spread brotherhood, friendship and agreement among people. He helped the poor and the needy and saw himself as a poor servant. Osman Sirajeddin asked people to work hard to earn a halal livelihood and encouraged people in this way. He would advise young people to learn useful knowledge and sciences. People came to him for important life decisions and he would guide them with divine inspiration. He was also an expert in herbal medicine and left a written record of it.

Death 
Seyyid Muhammed Osman Sirajeddin, a sheikh of the Naqshbandi and Qadiri orders, was one of the great mystic scholars of the 20th century and passed away on January 30, 1997. He was buried in the garden of his tekke in Hadımköy, Istanbul.

Works 

 Sirâcu'l Kulûb (Translation: Selahattin Alpay) ISBN 9789751625472
 Tafsīr Sūra Wa-t-Tīn
 Risāla al-Shihāb al-Thāqib
 Al-'Itiqād al-Rasīn wal-Yaqīn Billah

See also 

 Uthman Siraj-ud-Din Naqshbandi
 Sheikhs of Tavil
 Khalid al-Baghdadi

Notes 

 Osman Sirâceddîn-i Tavilî (en-nakşibendî, el-evvel) ve Ailesi (Osman Muhammed, 2017) ISBN 9786059261760

References 

1896 births
1997 deaths
20th-century Muslim theologians
Islamic scholars from the Ottoman Empire
Muslim saints
Sufis
Sufi saints